Pierce Collins Fulton (June 6, 1992 – April 29, 2021) was an American DJ, musician, multi-instrumentalist, and record producer. In 2014, Fulton's single "Runaway" topped the Billboard Emerging Artists chart. Later that year, his song "Kuaga (Lost Time)" was listed at number 38 on Billboards Dance/Mix Show Airplay chart and used in a Smirnoff ad campaign.

Career
In 2011, Fulton released his debut EP on Cr2 Records. In 2012, Fulton toured with Wolfgang Gartner. Fulton released the Runaway EP in March 2014, the single from the album, "Runaway" reached the top spot on Billboard's Twitter Emerging Artists chart. Fulton's follow-up single, "Kuaga (Lost Time)" experienced similar success and reached 38 on the Billboard Dance/Mix Show Airplay chart.

In 2015, Fulton began releasing music on Armin Van Buuren's label Armada Music. That same year, Fulton launched a side-project called "Shirts & Skins" with actor and DJ Ansel Elgort. In July 2016, Fulton released the four song EP, Borrowed Lives.

On June 30, 2017, he released his debut album, "Better Places" following the release of singles "Life in Letters", "Home in August", "Better Places", and "Listen To Your Mama".

In January 2020, Fulton and Gordon Huntley of Canadian duo Botnek introduced their Leaving Laurel alias. They released their first EP, titled Sometimes It's Scary...but It's Still You and Me / Need Little, Want Less, through Anjunadeep on January 10, 2020.

Death
On May 3, 2021, Pierce's brother Griffith Fulton announced that he had died on the evening of April 29, at age 28, following struggles with mental health.

Discography

Studio albums

Extended plays

Charted singles

As lead artist

Remixes

Music videos

References

External links 
 

1992 births
2021 deaths
2021 suicides
American DJs
American electronic musicians
Electronic dance music DJs
Place of death missing
Monstercat artists
Musicians from Vermont
Record producers from Vermont
Stmpd Rcrds artists
Suicides in the United States